Rocco Valdes, better known by his stage name Rocco Did It Again!, is an American record producer, songwriter, music publisher, and music executive.

Beginning his career in 2002, Valdes shares business and creative operations in the hip hop genre and music industry. He was appointed A&R for Def Jam Recordings in 2002. In 2005, he discovered and managed American singer T-Pain, and served as executive producer for his studio albums until 2011. On the creative side, he served as a record producer for singles including "223's" by YNW Melly, "Jump" by DaBaby, "Tick Tock" by Young Thug, among others. As a producer, he frequently co-produces with Dr. Luke and Ryan Ogren.

In 2021, he also produced the Billboard Hot 100 radio-friendly "Best Friend" by Saweetie and Doja Cat which was nominated for Best Rap Song at the 64th Annual Grammy Awards.

Life 
Rocco was born in Hialeah, Florida, where he attended Hialeah-Miami Lakes Senior High School. After High School, Rocco developed an interest in music and decided to go Full Sail University in Winter Park, Florida. Initially, Rocco wanted to be a music engineer but decided to he was more intrigued by the business side of music only to find himself back on the technical side of music later in his career.

Career 
Rocco's music career started in 2002 at record label Def Jam Recordings where he worked as an assistant for two years. In 2004, Rocco becomes a music manager and started managing music producer Jim Jonsin. In 2005, Rocco discovered artist T-Pain and managed his career for 10 years. In 2012, Rocco also discovered artist Austin Mahone and in 2018 he discovered artist 9lokknine. In 2019, Rocco Produced 223's by YNW Melly and 9lokknine which ranked at #2 on Spotify Top 50 in the United States and #34 on the Billboard Hot 100 chart. In 2020, Rocco produced the song "Jump" for Da Baby and Youngboy Never Broke Again.

Discography (producer/composer)

Charted singles

References

External links 
 
 

Living people
1980 births
People from Hialeah, Florida
Record producers from Florida
American hip hop record producers